

The Benoist XIV, also called The Lark of Duluth, was a small biplane flying boat built in the United States in 1913 in the hope of using it to carry paying passengers. The two examples built were used to provide the first heavier-than-air airline service anywhere in the world, and the first airline service of any kind at all in the United States.

Design and development
The aircraft was a conventional biplane with equal-span unstaggered wings with small pontoons at their tips. The engine was mounted on a pedestal aft of the cockpit and drove a two-blade pusher propeller.  Accommodation for the pilot and single passenger was side by side in an open cockpit.

Operational history
The first example, given Benoist construction number 43 and named Lark of Duluth, carried joyriders over the harbour at Duluth, Minnesota through the Summer of 1913, but the endeavor was not a commercial success. The repairs and paint job left the aircraft with the partial name, "of Du". Later that year, Percival Fansler, a business associate of designer Thomas W. Benoist, convinced Benoist to join him in establishing a scheduled air service between the Florida cities of St Petersburg and Tampa. Their newly formed company, the St. Petersburg–Tampa Airboat Line purchased the Lark of Duluth and another Benoist XIV to inaugurate operations. Regular tickets were priced at $5.00 (equivalent to $ in ), but Pheil had paid $400.00 ($ in ) at auction for the ticket for the first crossing.

Over the next three months of the airline's short lifetime, the Lark of Duluth and her near-sister Florida (construction number 45) carried 1,205 passengers over Tampa Bay. At the end of March, however, the city subsidy ran out, and it proved no longer profitable to continue the service. The Lark of Duluth spent the remainder of 1914 carrying joyriders in several locations around the United States, including Duluth, Conneaut Lake, and San Diego. The aircraft was damaged in a hard landing in San Diego and pronounced unsalvageable.

Replicas
 In 1984, a full-scale flying replica was constructed by Florida Aviation Historical Society for the 70th anniversary of the flight. This aircraft is now on loan to the St. Petersburg Museum of History in St. Petersburg, Florida.
 A second replica of the 1913 Lark of Duluth was constructed by the Duluth Aviation Institute and FAA certified to commemorate the 100th anniversary of commercial aviation.
 A full-scale replica of the Model XIV is being built by Kermit Weeks at Fantasy of Flight that they plan on flying on the centennial of Tony Jannus' first scheduled commercial flight on January 1, 2014.

Operators

St. Petersburg–Tampa Airboat Line

Specifications

Gallery

See also
 Pusher aircraft

References
Notes

Bibliography
 
 Michaels, Will. The Making of St. Petersburg. 2012 History Press Charleston pp. 89–99.
 
 Sport Aviation December 1983
 airminded.net
 Duluth International Airport website
 Servis, Richard. "Tony Jannus and the World's First Commercial Airline". Non Fiction Reader Magazine
 Letter from St Petersburg Museum of History executive director Will Michaels printed in the St Petersburg Times 2 February 2004.
 Pioneer Pilot Walter E. Lees

External links

 Contemporary postcards
 Photographs of St Petersburg Museum of History display
 "Some American Flying Boats", Flight, February 28, 1914.

Single-engined pusher aircraft
Biplanes
14
1910s United States airliners
Flying boats
Aircraft first flown in 1913